Frederick Richard McManus (born February 8, 1923, Lynn, Massachusetts – died November 27, 2005, Boston, Massachusetts) was an American Catholic priest and academic, who served as a peritus on the liturgy at the Second Vatican Council. He presided at the first English Mass in the United States in 1964 in St. Louis, Missouri.

He was also a leader in the church in opening up dialogue with the Eastern Orthodox Church, served as dean of The Catholic University of America's School of Canon Law, and published eleven books on the liturgy as well as hundreds of popular articles, spending 40 years as editor of The Jurist: Studies in Church Law and Ministry.

Biography

Early life 
Born to Frederick and Mary (née Twomey) McManus, he had a younger brother Charles McManus. He attended Boston College High School followed by the College of the Holy Cross from 1940-42. He went on to St. John's Seminary in Brighton and received a Bachelor of Arts in 1947. He was ordained a priest on May 1, 1947.

Education and career 
He received the following degrees: JCB (1952), JCL (1953) and JCD (1954), all from The Catholic University of America (CUA), where he served as Dean of the School of Canon Law 1967-1973, Vice Provost and Dean of Graduate Studies 1974-1983, and Academic Vice President, retiring in 1993 while continuing to teach until 1997 as Professor Emeritus.

Second Vatican Council
Monsignor McManus attended the Second Vatican Council as a peritus on the liturgy and member of the council's Liturgy Commission. He was the primary drafter of sections of the Constitution on the Sacred Liturgy. McManus served two terms as president of the Liturgical Conference. He was also made director of the Committee on the Liturgical Apostolate in 1965

Associations and ecumenism
Msgr. McManus served as president of the Liturgical Conference from 1959–62 and 1964-65. He was key in establishing the Federation of Diocesan Commissions (FDLC) in 1968. He was a member of the International Commission on English in the Liturgy (ICEL) from its inception in 1963 throughout decades of translation. He helped promote dialogue between the Roman Catholic and Orthodox Churches. He consulted for the Secretariat for Promoting Christian Unity, was a member of the Catholic-Orthodox Bilateral Commission and served on the International Joint Commission for Catholic-Orthodox Theological Dialogue.

Death
He died in Boston, Massachusetts on November 27, 2005, at age 82.

See also

References

External links
 https://web.archive.org/web/20110719153032/http://www.naal-liturgy.org/memorials/fmcmanus.html
 http://dsjliturgy.blogspot.com/2005/12/keep-in-mind-msgr-frederick-r-mcmanus.html
 https://web.archive.org/web/20101215094244/http://fdlc.org/Awards_McManusAbout.htm

1923 births
2005 deaths
People from Lynn, Massachusetts
College of the Holy Cross alumni
Boston College High School alumni
Catholic University of America School of Canon Law alumni
20th-century American Roman Catholic priests
Catholic University of America School of Canon Law faculty
Liturgists
American Roman Catholic religious writers
Burials in Massachusetts
Catholics from Massachusetts
21st-century American Roman Catholic priests